The Tarlac–Pangasinan–La Union Expressway (TPLEX), signed as E1 of the Philippine expressway network and R-8 of the Metro Manila arterial road network, is a controlled-access toll expressway that connects the Central Luzon region with the Ilocos Region.

While proposals for a construction of an expressway system from Metro Manila to La Union had been raised before the 2000s, the construction of the TPLEX only began in January 2010. The expressway began operations on October 31, 2013. The final section from Pozorrubio to Rosario was opened to motorists on July 15, 2020.

Route description

TPLEX follows a route that parallels the MacArthur Highway, running through the provinces of Tarlac, Nueva Ecija, Pangasinan, and La Union. The expressway has four lanes, two per direction, separated by Jersey barriers. Sections by exits, toll plazas, viaducts, and their approaches are illuminated at night. Significant sections are built on embankments overlooking rice paddy fields. The expressway crosses the four rivers in the Pangasinan province. The rivers along the TPLEX are the Agno River, Binalonan River, Aloragat River, and the Bued River.

The Tarlac–Pangasinan–La Union Expressway starts in Tarlac City as an extension of the Subic–Clark–Tarlac Expressway. The expressway passes through the municipalities of Victoria, Pura, Ramos, and Anao. Significant stretches of the expressway in Tarlac are built on embankments, and existing roads cross through underpasses built on cuts in the embankment. The road passes to Nampicuan and Cuyapo in Nueva Ecija without exit before entering Ilocos Region and Pangasinan, at the municipality of Rosales.

The Pangasinan segment of TPLEX starts at the Rosales municipality. The expressway then crosses through a viaduct over the Agno River, then enters Urdaneta, which is served by a single interchange to connect with Manila North Road. The Urdaneta exit was the expressway's northern terminus before the extension to Binalonan. Past Urdaneta Exit, TPLEX crosses above the Manila North Road, then passes over Binalonan and Pozorrubio. The last exit in the province is Sison, still under construction and not yet included in the opening of the main carriageway.

Past the Sison exit, the expressway crosses as a viaduct over the Bued River. The road then enters the Rosario municipality, where the main northern toll plaza is located. Past the Rosario toll plaza, a spur road connects to the Rosario rotunda. This is the expressway's northern terminus. Proposals have been raised to extend the project to Laoag in Ilocos Norte.

History

Conception and early development
Despite calls to create an expressway system from the Philippine capital of Manila to Rosario, the southernmost town of the La Union province had been raised before the turn of the millennium. These calls began to bear fruit in the mid-2000s. In 2005, construction began on the Subic–Clark–Tarlac Expressway (SCTEX), a linked expressway system reaching Tarlac City. This was an improvement over the North Luzon Expressway's terminus which reached only to Mabalacat, Pampanga.

In 2006, Congressional representatives from Northern Luzon took advantage of the final reading of House Bill 5749 to lobby for a project to extend the expressway to Rosario, as a means to boost trade, tourism, and reduce travel times in the provinces of Tarlac, Eastern Pangasinan, and La Union. This lobbying led the Arroyo administration in October 2006 to announce a ten-year plan to extend the North Luzon Expressway (NLEX) from Mabalacat, Pampanga, to Rosario, La Union, and extend the South Luzon Expressway (SLEX) from Calamba, Laguna, to Lucena in Quezon, and eventually to Matnog, Sorsogon. In 2008, the SCTEX was formally opened, setting the stage for developing the TPLEX, which would extend beyond the SCTEX's terminus in Tarlac City. The initial construction plan for the TPLEX called for it to be implemented in two phases: The first phase would involve constructing two lanes, with the second phase expanding it to four lanes to accommodate 25,000 vehicles.

The proposed superhighway would be built parallel to MacArthur Highway, passing through the city of Tarlac and the municipalities of La Paz, Gerona, Victoria, Pura, Anao, and Ramos in Tarlac, Nampicuan and Cuyapo in Nueva Ecija and Rosales, Villasis, Urdaneta, Binalonan, Laoac, Pozorrubio, and Sison in Pangasinan, and Rosario, La Union.

The financing, design, construction, operation, and maintenance of the Tarlac–La Union Toll Expressway Phase 1 was eventually awarded to Private Infra Dev Corporation (now SMC TPLEX Corporation).

Project financing 
Three local banks undertook financing the TPLEX: BDO Unibank, Development Bank of the Philippines, and Land Bank of the Philippines. This made TPLEX notable in the Infrastructure and Development Financing industry as "the first Public-Private Partnership project in the Philippines to feature an all-domestic cast of sponsors and lenders.” London-based Project Finance Magazine named the TPLEX as its "Asia Pacific Transport Deal of the Year" for 2011.

The project is being implemented through public-private partnership using the build–operate–transfer (BOT) scheme in which the project proponent is responsible to design, finance and build the initial two-lane expressway. As each section is completed, it is turned over to the government, which then grants the proponent a franchise to operate and maintain the toll road, after which the proponent, once the Toll Regulatory Board issues a toll operation certificate, operates the road under a long term concession agreement with the government.

Development disputes

Land acquisition 
In the early development of the project, acquisition of rights of way (ROW) contributed to delays. With the TPLEX identified as a high priority government project, the Department of Public Works and Highways (DPWH) was tasked with acquiring the rights of way for the project's proposed alignment, and was allocated ₱793 million ($16.6 million US) in hope that the process could be expedited. However, legal disputes that had arisen regarding affected properties, notably in the Tarlac segment of the project, meant delays in negotiations undertaken by the DPWH.

Alignment of the Rosario interchange 
The expected completion of the entire expressway caused a major delay when an unsolicited proposal was brought up to change the alignment of the project to change the location of the final interchange in Rosario, La Union. Former Pangasinan 5th District Representative Mark Cojuangco proposed three alignments: one would pass through Urdaneta City, then San Fabian, and exits Brgy. Cataguintingan of Rosario, La Union.  This is about  longer from the original TPLEX terminus at barangay Subusob, Rosario. The second proposal will also pass through San Fabian but will end at the original TPLEX end at barangay Subusob. The first two proposals skips Pozorrubio. The third proposal will pass through Pozorrubio, San Fabian, and then end at barangay Subusub. All proposals intend to skip the municipality of Sison. The Cordillera Administrative Region Development Council has rejected the idea. The target completion date had been moved from end of April 2017 to end April 2018.

Phases 1 and 2 
The first phase of the Tarlac-La Union Expressway started in January 2010. In April 2013, San Miguel Corporation announced that the segment from Tarlac City up to Urdaneta will be built with four lanes, instead of the initial plan of two lanes only. However, this also pushed back the opening day of the expressway from June 2013 to November 2013.

On October 25, 2013, the Toll Regulatory Board authorized the issuance of the Toll Operation Permit for the Tarlac City–Pura segment of the TPLEX after the construction of that segment was completed by Private Infra Dev Corp. (PIDC), the all-Filipino consortium backed by conglomerates San Miguel Corporation (SMC) and DMCI Holdings, Inc.

This first phase, referred to as section 1A, begins with a connection to SCTEX, then stretches  from Tarlac City to Victoria, and then to Pura, Tarlac. On April 16, 2014, phase 1 of the project was completed when the Rosales section was opened. In December 2014, phase 2 of the project, covering  from Carmen to Urdaneta, was opened to traffic, as what PIDC president Mark Dumol had announced on the day the completion of phase 1 was announced.

Phase 3
In December 2014, Dumol projected that the last section, covering  from Urdaneta to Rosario and including an exit in Pozorrubio, would be completed some time in 2015. The DPWH and the PIDC announced in July 2015 that they will continue to follow the original plan for the last phase exiting in Rosario, adding that this last phase would be completed by the following year, 2016.

This development phase was further subdivided into phase 3A, from Urdaneta to Pozorrubio, and phase 3B, Pozorrubio to Rosario. Section 3A would include trumpet-type interchanges at Binalonan and Pozorrubio, while section 3B include an interchange at Sison and the roundabout-style terminus interchange in Rosario, La Union.

After the opening of the exit at Pozorrubio in December 2017, the DPWH said segment 3B from Pozorrubio to Rosario is expected to be completed in June 2019. By mid-August 2016, the first exit of section 3A, at Binalonan Exit, had been opened to the driving public. By December 6, 2017, the last exit of section 3A, at Pozorrubio, Pangasinan, had been opened to the driving public. The Binalonan to Pozorrubio section was expected to open around October 27, 2017, but the section did not open on that date due to the minor right-of-way issues on the missing  fence.

By July 15, 2020, the Pozorrubio to Rosario segment of the expressway opened to motorists, with the exception of the Sison exit, which was still under construction as the main carriageway opened.

Future

La Union extension 
As a part of the project of increasing the  radius of High Standard Highways of the Japan International Cooperation Agency (JICA) into a  radius from Metro Manila, the expressway will be extended to the city of San Fernando, La Union. There are also plans to move the extension terminus to San Juan, La Union and will be divided into three segments, namely:

Laoag extension 
On June 11, 2013, at the San Miguel Corporation annual stockholders meeting, Chairman, Eduardo Cojuangco Jr., revealed plans to extend the expressway north to Laoag, Ilocos Norte. He said that extending the toll road to Laoag had been raised during the Arroyo administration.

Toll

The Tarlac–Pangasinan–La Union Expressway uses a closed road tolling system where motorists pay tolls according to vehicle class and kilometers travelled. On April 8, 2019, the Auto-sweep electronic toll collection (ETC) system, an RFID enhanced toll system, was implemented at TPLEX. This ensures interoperability with other SMC-operated tollways and those of MPTC's such as NLEX SCTEX.

Exits

San Juan, La Union extension

References

External links

Road map of the proposed Tarlac–La Union expressway

Toll roads in the Philippines
Roads in La Union
Roads in Pangasinan
Roads in Nueva Ecija
Roads in Tarlac